The  is a light rail line under construction between Haga, Tochigi and Utsunomiya, the capital of Tochigi Prefecture, Japan.

History
The project was approved in 2016.  Construction started in 2018, with a target opening date of March 2022, but this has been postponed to March 2023 and even this target looks unlikely to be met.

Services

Rolling stock
The line will be served by Utsunomiya Light Rail HU300 Series (宇都宮ライトレールHU300形) trains built by Niigata Transys, branded Lightline.

Stations

See also
List of light-rail transit systems
List of railway lines in Japan

References

External links
  

Railway lines in Japan
Tram transport in Japan
Utsunomiya
Rail transport in Tochigi Prefecture
1067 mm gauge railways in Japan
Japanese third-sector railway lines
750 V DC railway electrification
2023 in rail transport